Gallito may refer to:
 Crested gallito (Rhinocrypta lanceolata), a species of bird
 Sandy gallito (Teledromas fuscus), a species of bird
 Erythrina fusca, a species of flowering tree
 Gallito (song), a song Jonathan Roberts danced to on Dancing with the Stars
 El Gallito, a 2004 song by Aidan Girt

See also 
 Gallitos de Isabela, a nickname given to people from the city of Isabela, Puerto Rico
 Sixto Escobar (1913–1979), first world boxing champion from Puerto Rico, nicknamed "Gallito de Isabela"